is an  actress and model in Japan. She has appeared in films Eureka, Station To Heaven, Natsumeke No Shokutaku, and Shark Skin Man and Peach Hip Girl.

In the 1980s she married Hiroshi Oguchi, a Tokyo scene celebrity, and drummer of bands The Tempters and Vodka Collins. Oguchi made a photographic essay of his wife in the book Made in Love in 1989.

Filmography

Film
The Resurrection of the Golden Wolf (1979)
Shikake-nin Baian (1981)
Shark Skin Man and Peach Hip Girl (1999)
Eureka (2000)
Tomorrow's Dinner Table (2021), Yukie Ishibashi

Television
Hana Moyu (2015)

References

External links 

Japanese actresses
Living people
1959 births